The 1989 Carson–Newman Eagles football team was an American football team that represented Carson–Newman College (renamed Carson–Newman University in 2012) as a member of the South Atlantic Conference (SAC) during the 1989 NAIA Division I football season. In its tenth year under head coach Ken Sparks, the team compiled a 12–1 record (6–1 against conference opponents) and won the SAC championship. 

They faced  in the Champion Bowl, winning by a 34–20 score to win the NAIA national championship. It was the fifth of five national championships won by Carson–Newman in seven years (1983, 1984, 1986, 1988, and 1989).

After the season, Sparks was chosen as the SAC Coach of the Year, the fourth time he won the award. In addition, Carson–Newman strong safety Joe Fishback was named SAC Defensive Player of the Year, and free safety Chuck Proffitt was named SAC Freshman of the Year. Seven Carson–Newman players received first-team honors on the All-SAC team: running back Vernon Turner; offensive linemen Kelly Rasnic and Paige Belcher; place-kicker Rick Wetsel; defensive lineman John Mefford; and defensive backs Joe Fishback and David Pool.

Schedule

References

Carson–Newman Eagles
Carson–Newman Eagles football seasons
NAIA Football National Champions
South Atlantic Conference football champion seasons
Carson–Newman Eagles football